Elections to Chichester District Council in West Sussex, United Kingdom were held on 3 May 2007. The whole council was up for election and the Conservative Party held overall control with an increased majority.

Election result

|}

1 Conservative candidate was unopposed.

The +/- in seats is calculated after any by-election results since the last full council election.
The +/- in vote % is calculated from the % at the last full council election.

Ward results

By-Election results

See Chichester local elections for by-election results since this Council election.

External links
 2007 Chichester District election result

2007
2007 English local elections
2000s in West Sussex